Andriy Tsukanov , born 28 November 1980) is a Ukrainian Paralympic footballer who won a gold medal at the 2008 Summer Paralympics in China.

References

External links
 

1980 births
Living people
Paralympic 7-a-side football players of Ukraine
Paralympic gold medalists for Ukraine
Paralympic silver medalists for Ukraine
Paralympic medalists in football 7-a-side
Medalists at the 2000 Summer Paralympics
Medalists at the 2008 Summer Paralympics
Medalists at the 2004 Summer Paralympics
7-a-side footballers at the 2000 Summer Paralympics
7-a-side footballers at the 2004 Summer Paralympics
7-a-side footballers at the 2008 Summer Paralympics